Grevillea beadleana, commonly known as Beadle's grevillea, is a species of flowering plant in the family Proteaceae and is endemic to New South Wales. It is a shrub with dissected leaves and grey to purplish flowers with a burgundy to scarlet style.

Description
The lower surface of the leaves is densely covered with curled hairs.

Taxonomy
Grevillea beadleana was first formally described in 1986 by Donald McGillivray in his book New Names in Grevillea (Proteaceae), based on specimens collected in 1982 by J.B. Williams near Chaelundi Falls in Guy Fawkes River National Park. The specific epithet (beadleana) honours Noel Beadle.

Distribution and habitat
Beadle's grevillea grows in forest and woodland in shallow soil over granite, and occurs in four known populations. Most plants occur north of Torrington, the remainder in the Oxley Wild Rivers National Park, the Guy Fawkes River National Park and in the Orara River catchment.

The species was first collected near Walcha in 1887, but it has not been seen in that area despite extensive searches.

Conservation status
Grevillea beadleana is listed as "endangered" under the Australian Government Environment Protection and Biodiversity Conservation Act 1999 and the New South Wales Government Threatened Species Conservation Act 1995. The main threats to the species include inappropriate fire regimes, grazing by native animals and by livestock, and illegal collection.

References

beadleana
Flora of New South Wales
Proteales of Australia
Taxa named by Donald McGillivray
Plants described in 1986